KBGM may refer to:

 The ICAO code for Greater Binghamton Airport
 KBGM (FM), a radio station (91.1 FM) licensed to Park Hills, Missouri, United States